Robert J. Harris (Bob) is a Scottish academic and author, particularly of children's fantasies and historical novels, best known for his collaborations with Jane Yolen. He also designed the fantasy board game Talisman and its sequel Mythgardia.

Life
Harris was born in Dundee and studied at the University of St. Andrews, achieving a first class honours degree in Latin. Harris lives in Scotland and is married to American author Deborah Turner Harris.

Works
His recent adult suspense-adventure works The Thirty-One Kings and Castle Macnab feature the return of John Buchan's classic adventurer-spy character Richard Hannay, first made famous in The Thirty-Nine Steps book and films.

Young Heroes
(Written with Jane Yolen, based on Greek Mythology)

Odysseus in the Serpent Maze (2001)
Hippolyta and the Curse of the Amazons (2002)
Atalanta and the Arcadian Beast (2003)
Hippolyta and the Lost Amazon City (2003)

The Scottish Quartet
(with Jane Yolen)
Queen’s Own Fool (2000)
Girl  in a Cage (2002)
Prince Across the Water (2004)
The Rogues (2007)

Young Legends
Leonardo and the Death Machine (2005)
Will Shakespeare and the Devil's Fire (2006)

Greg and Lewis
The Day the World Went Loki (2013) 
Thor is Locked in my Garage (2014)
Odin blew up my TV (2016)

The Artie Conan Doyle Mysteries
The Gravediggers Club (2017)
The Vanishing Dragon (2018)

Richard Hannay Returns
The Thirty-One Kings (2017)
Castle Macnab (2018)

Sherlock Holmes in WWII
 A Study in Crimson (2022) 
 The Devil's Blaze (2022)

Short fiction
"The City of Brass" (with Deborah Turner Harris) (1995)
"The Ragmore Beast" (1997)
"Studies in Stone" (with Jane Yolen) (1998)
"The Company of Three" (with Deborah Turner Harris) (1998)
"Last Kingdom" (with Deborah Turner Harris) (1999)
"Old Jim Croaker Jumps Over the Moon" (2000)
"Straight and True" (2000)
"Requiem Antarctica" (with Jane Yolen) (2000)

References

External links
The Website of Deborah Turner Harris and Robert J Harris

Living people
Scottish fantasy writers
Writers from Dundee
1955 births
Alumni of the University of St Andrews